|}

The Old Roan Chase is a Grade 2 National Hunt steeplechase in Great Britain which is open to horses aged four years or older. It is run on the Mildmay Course at Aintree over a distance of about 2 miles and 4 furlongs (2 miles 3 furlongs and 200 yards, or 4,023 metres), and during its running there are sixteen fences to be jumped. It is a limited handicap race, and it is scheduled to take place each year in late October.

The event was established in 2004, and it was initially called the Wigan Chase. It includes the name of Monet's Garden, a three-time winner of the race, in its title.

Records
Most successful horse (3 wins):
 Monet's Garden – 2007, 2009, 2010

Leading trainer (3 wins):
 Nicky Richards – Monet's Garden (2007, 2009, 2010)
 Paul Nicholls - Kauto Star (2006), Sound Investment (2015), Frodon (2018)

Leading jockey (2 wins):
 Tony McCoy – Albertas Run (2011), Conquisto (2013)
 Brian Hughes - Forest Bihan (2019), Riders Onthe Storm (2022)

Winners
 Weights given in stones and pounds.

See also
 Horse racing in Great Britain
 List of British National Hunt races

References
 Racing Post:
 pedigreequery.com – Old Roan Chase – Aintree.

External links
 Career 1-2-3 Colour Chart – Monet's Garden

National Hunt races in Great Britain
Aintree Racecourse
National Hunt chases
Recurring sporting events established in 2004
2004 establishments in England